Ora is a genus of flea marsh beetles in the family Scirtidae. There are about 17 described species in Ora.

Species
These 17 species belong to the genus Ora:

 Ora atroapicalis Pic, 1928 g
 Ora bivittata Pic, 1922 g
 Ora brevieminentia g
 Ora bruchi Pic, 1928 g
 Ora depressa Fabricius, 1801 g
 Ora discoidea Champion, 1897 i c g b
 Ora dufaui Legros, 1947 g
 Ora hyacintha Blatchley, 1914 i c g b
 Ora improtecta Watts, 2004 g
 Ora mediolineata Pic, 1928 g
 Ora megadepressa g
 Ora nigropunctata Motschulsky, 1863 g
 Ora platensis Brethes, 1925 g
 Ora semibrunnea Pic, 1922 g
 Ora texana Champion, 1897 i c g b (Texas flea marsh beetle)
 Ora troberti (Guérin-Méneville, 1861) i c g b
 Ora wagneri Pic, 1928 g

Data sources: i = ITIS, c = Catalogue of Life, g = GBIF, b = Bugguide.net

References

Further reading

 

Scirtoidea
Articles created by Qbugbot
Elateriformia genera